The Boot Monument is an American Revolutionary War memorial located in Saratoga National Historical Park, New York. It commemorates Major General Benedict Arnold's service at the Battles of Saratoga in the Continental Army, but does not name him.

Background 

John Watts de Peyster, a former major general for the New York State Militia during the American Civil War and writer of several military histories about the Battle of Saratoga, erected the monument to commemorate Arnold's contribution to the Continental Army's victory over the British. Arnold was wounded in the foot during the Battle of Quebec, and suffered further injury in the Battle of Ridgefield when his horse was shot out from under him. His last battle injury was at Saratoga, and it occurred near where this monument is located at Tour Stop #7 – Breymann Redoubt. The leg wound effectively ended his career as a fighting soldier. It reads:

Arnold's perceived offenses 

Arnold suffered what he considered a series of slights and insults by the Continental Congress in the months and years following Saratoga, as the Revolutionary War continued. He also opposed treaties that brought French military assistance to the Americans.  The wounded Arnold began negotiations with British agents that culminated in his changing sides in September 1780.  As part of these negotiations, Arnold attempted unsuccessfully to hand his American command, the key fortification of West Point, over to the British. 

This attempt failed because of the capture of Major John André. Following the overall failure of the treasonous operation, Arnold escaped to the British lines. As a reward for turning his coat, Arnold was paid £6,000 and commissioned as a brigadier general in the King's troops. For the rest of the war he headed raiding parties that probed Continental Congress-controlled territories and tried to do damage.

Based on one of these raids, an apocryphal story that has circulated in various versions states:

References

Sources 
Randall, Willard Sterne.  Benedict Arnold: Patriot and Traitor.  Dorset Press, New York, 1990.
Sneiderman, Barney. Warriors Seven: Seven American Commanders, Seven Battles, and the Irony of Command. Savas Beatie, New York, 2006.

External links 
National Park Service page on the monument

1887 sculptures
American Revolutionary War sites
Benedict Arnold
Monuments and memorials in New York (state)
Marble sculptures in New York (state)
Military boots
Tourist attractions in Saratoga County, New York